
Juri Quta (Aymara juri mud, foul water, dull, wet quta lake, "mud lake" or "dull lake ", Hispanicized spellings Juri Kkota, Juri Khota, Juri Kota, Yuri Kkota) is a lake in the Cordillera Real of Bolivia located in the La Paz Department, Los Andes Province, Pukarani Municipality, Wayna Potosí Canton. It is situated at a height of about 4,932  metres (16,181 ft) south west of the Kunturiri massif and west of lake Ch'iyar Quta.

See also 
 Sura Quta

References

External links 
 Pukarani Municipality: population data and map

Lakes of La Paz Department (Bolivia)